Warburgia salutaris (pepper-bark tree) is a species of tree in the family Canellaceae. It is found in eastern and southern African locations e.g. Botswana, Namibia, Kenya, Tanzania, Zambia, Mozambique, South Africa, Eswatini, Malawi and Zimbabwe. It is threatened by habitat loss. It is a popular medicinal plant and is overharvested in the wild, another reason for its endangerment. The Pepper-bark tree is a protected tree in South Africa. Various projects are investigating methods of propagation under controlled conditions with subsequent planting in the wild.

This is an erect tree growing up to about ten metres in maximum height, but known to reach 20 metres at times. It has a thick canopy of aromatic, shiny green leaves. The evergreen leaf blades are lance-shaped, measuring up to 11 cm long by 3 wide. The flowers have ten yellow-green petals. They are each just under a centimeter long and are solitary or borne in small clusters of up to 3. The fruit is a berry, leathery purple or black in color when ripe, measuring up to 4 cm wide.

The leaves are used to add peppery flavoring to food and tea. The bitter taste of the tree's bark and leaves is due to the presence of iridoids. The aromatic, oily, yellowish wood is used for firewood.

It is attractive and makes a good shade tree.

Traditional medicine 
This plant is used medicinally by the Maasai people to treat malaria. It is used as a snuff or smoked for respiratory complaints such as common cold and cough. The bark can be purchased at markets in Tanzania, and elsewhere. Moreover, "Dried bark is chewed and the juice swallowed, thus acting as remedy for stomach-ache, constipation, coughs, fever, toothache, muscle pains, weak joints, and general body pains."

Gallery

References

Canellaceae
Protected trees of South Africa
Trees of Angola
Flora of Mozambique
Flora of Swaziland
Flora of Malawi
Flora of Zimbabwe
Endangered plants
Medicinal plants
Taxonomy articles created by Polbot